The list of ship launches in 1802 includes a chronological list of some ships launched in 1802.


References

1802
Ship launches